Acidogona pendula is a species of tephritid or fruit flies in the genus Acidogona of the family Tephritidae.

Distribution
Guatemala.

References

Tephritinae
Insects described in 2010
Diptera of South America